Somaj Kollyan KS Mugda is a Bangladeshi football club based in Dhaka. It currently competes in the Bangladesh Championship League, the 2nd tier of Bangladeshi football league.

History
Somaj Kallyan KS Mugda club from Dhaka its established 20 February 1980.

Current squad
The club management have not yet announced the squad for upcoming season.

BCL performance by year

Top goalscorers by season

Head coach records

Club management

Current technical staff
As of October 2022

References

Football clubs in Bangladesh
Sport in Dhaka
Bangladesh Championship League